Mambare River is a river in Oro Province, Papua New Guinea, located at .

History
Alluvial gold was discovered in the river at the end of the 19th century. By 1898 there were 150 miners working on the Mambare and Girua Rivers.

The Imperial Japanese had a supply dump located at the mouth of the Mambare River during World War II.

References

Rivers of Papua New Guinea
Gold mines in Papua New Guinea